is a Japanese footballer who plays for Blaublitz Akita.

Club team career statistics
Updated to 6 January 2023.

Reserves performance

Last Updated: 25 February 2019

References

External links
Profile at Cerezo Osaka
Profile at FC Tokyo

1991 births
Living people
Momoyama Gakuin University alumni
Association football people from Nagasaki Prefecture
Japanese footballers
J1 League players
J2 League players
J3 League players
FC Tokyo players
FC Tokyo U-23 players
Cerezo Osaka players
Cerezo Osaka U-23 players
Avispa Fukuoka players
Matsumoto Yamaga FC players
SC Sagamihara players
Blaublitz Akita players
Association football goalkeepers
Universiade bronze medalists for Japan
Universiade medalists in football
Medalists at the 2013 Summer Universiade